is a Tokyo-based Japanese photographer. Her work is described as creating serene and solitary landscapes; her photography has featured scenes from Amsterdam, as well as Japan.

Major exhibitions
 "half awake and half asleep in the water", Festival Images Vevey, Switzerland (2016)
 "Coming Closer and Getting Further Away", Tokyo Art Museum, Tokyo (2009)
 "half awake and half asleep in the water", Yossi Milo Gallery, New York (2008)

Publications
Asako Narahashi: Funiculi Funicula. Photographs 1998–2003 (2004)

Notes

External links
 Article in the blog of The New York Times In Focus | Asako Narahashi.

Japanese photographers
Living people
1959 births
People from Tokyo